Donje Ratkovo  is a village in the municipalities of Ribnik, Bosnia and Herzegovina, Republika Srpska and Ključ, Bosnia and Herzegovina .

Demographics 
According to the 2013 census, its population was 162, all Serbs with 112 living in the Republika Srpska part and 50 living in the Ključ part.

References

Populated places in Ključ
Populated places in Ribnik